The 1973–74 NBA season was the Bulls' 8th season in the NBA.

Offseason

Draft picks

Roster

Regular season

Season standings

z – clinched division title
y – clinched division title
x – clinched playoff spot

Record vs. opponents

Game log

Playoffs

|- align="center" bgcolor="#ffcccc"
| 1
| March 30
| Detroit
| L 88–97
| Jerry Sloan (24)
| Sloan, Ray (10)
| Norm Van Lier (6)
| Chicago Stadium10,711
| 0–1
|- align="center" bgcolor="#ccffcc"
| 2
| April 1
| @ Detroit
| W 108–103
| Bob Love (38)
| Clifford Ray (11)
| Norm Van Lier (9)
| Cobo Arena11,499
| 1–1
|- align="center" bgcolor="#ccffcc"
| 3
| April 5
| Detroit
| W 84–83
| Chet Walker (21)
| Jerry Sloan (14)
| Norm Van Lier (5)
| Chicago Stadium17,634
| 2–1
|- align="center" bgcolor="#ffcccc"
| 4
| April 7
| @ Detroit
| L 87–102
| Bob Love (23)
| Clifford Ray (9)
| Norm Van Lier (9)
| Cobo Arena11,287
| 2–2
|- align="center" bgcolor="#ccffcc"
| 5
| April 9
| Detroit
| W 98–94
| Bob Love (32)
| Jerry Sloan (17)
| Norm Van Lier (4)
| Chicago Stadium14,236
| 3–2
|- align="center" bgcolor="#ffcccc"
| 6
| April 11
| @ Detroit
| L 88–92
| Chet Walker (33)
| Clifford Ray (15)
| Norm Van Lier (10)
| Cobo Arena11,134
| 3–3
|- align="center" bgcolor="#ccffcc"
| 7
| April 13
| Detroit
| W 96–94
| Chet Walker (26)
| Clifford Ray (15)
| Bob Weiss (5)
| Chicago Stadium13,133
| 4–3
|-

|- align="center" bgcolor="#ffcccc"
| 1
| April 16
| @ Milwaukee
| L 85–101
| Norm Van Lier (26)
| Bob Love (10)
| Norm Van Lier (10)
| Milwaukee Arena10,938
| 0–1
|- align="center" bgcolor="#ffcccc"
| 2
| April 18
| Milwaukee
| L 111–113
| Norm Van Lier (27)
| Clifford Ray (15)
| Norm Van Lier (7)
| Chicago Stadium17,787
| 0–2
|- align="center" bgcolor="#ffcccc"
| 3
| April 20
| @ Milwaukee
| L 90–113
| Bob Love (30)
| Clifford Ray (15)
| Clifford Ray (6)
| Milwaukee Arena10,938
| 0–3
|- align="center" bgcolor="#ffcccc"
| 4
| April 22
| Milwaukee
| L 99–115
| Bob Love (32)
| Love, Ray (8)
| Norm Van Lier (7)
| Chicago Stadium12,762
| 0–4
|-

Awards and records
Norm Van Lier, All-NBA Second Team
Jerry Sloan, NBA All-Defensive First Team
Norm Van Lier, NBA All-Defensive First Team
Bob Love, NBA All-Defensive Second Team
Chet Walker, NBA All-Star Game
Norm Van Lier, NBA All-Star Game

References

Chicago
Chicago Bulls seasons
Chicago Bulls
Chicago Bulls